Harold Nelson may refer to:

Harold George Nelson (1881–1947), Australian politician
Harold Nelson (athlete) (1923–2011), New Zealand long-distance runner
Harold "H" Nelson (1928–2016), English cycling coach
Harold E. H. Nelson (1871–1948), British book illustrator, artist and designer of bookplates
Harold G. Nelson (born 1943), American architect, consultant and systems scientist
Harold S. Nelson (1890-1972), American lawyer and politician

See also
Harry Nelson (disambiguation)